Appleton is a town in the northeastern part of Newfoundland in the province of Newfoundland and Labrador, Canada.

It is located in Division No. 6, on Gander Lake, south east of Glenwood.

History 
Appleton was incorporated on February 27, 1962. On January 27, 1962, a public meeting was held at the Appleton Community School for the purpose of organizing the community under the Community Councils Act.  Mr. William B. Temple acted as Chairman and Lewis C. Little acted as Secretary.  There were thirty-seven voters in attendance.  It was voted that there would be five members on the Appleton Community Council:

-Miss Zippoorah Steele
-Mr. Wilfred Richards 
-Mr. Lewis C. Little
-Mr. Leslie Reid
-Mr. Cyril Ford

Demographics 

See also
 List of cities and towns in Newfoundland and Labrador

References

Towns in Newfoundland and Labrador